Plavsk is a town and the administrative center of Plavsky District in Tula Oblast, Russia, located on the Plava River. Population:

Administrative and municipal status
Within the framework of administrative divisions, Plavsk serves as the administrative center of Plavsky District. As an administrative division, it is incorporated within Plavsky District as Plavsk Town Under District Jurisdiction. As a municipal division, Plavsk Town Under District Jurisdiction is incorporated within Plavsky Municipal District as Plavsk Urban Settlement.

References

Sources

Notes



Cities and towns in Tula Oblast